Qeshlaq-e Tak Quyi may refer to:
Qeshlaq-e Tak Quyi Matlab va Ali Khan
Qeshlaq-e Tak Quyi Qarah Piran
Qeshlaq-e Takqui-ye Qarah Piran-e Hazrat-e Qoli